I Loved a Woman is a 1933 American pre-Code drama directed by Alfred E. Green, starring Kay Francis, Edward G. Robinson, and Genevieve Tobin. According to producer Hal Wallis' autobiography (with Charles Higham), Robinson and Francis "were oddly matched. Kay was so tall that we had to put Eddie [Robinson] on a box in some scenes to bring him level with her and, understandably he was humiliated. Irritable and self-conscious, he argued with Kay frequently. But he [...] gave credit to her fine acting." However, it was Wallis and other executives who also made the choice to cut three of Kay's scenes, leaving her presence in the film really as a supporting actress.

Plot
John Hayden, owner of a Chicago meat-packing company, falls in love with a beautiful opera singer.

Cast
 Edward G. Robinson as John Mansfield Hayden
 Kay Francis as Laura McDonald
 Genevieve Tobin as Martha Lane Hayden
 Robert Barrat as Charles Lane 
 Murray Kinnell as Davenport
 Robert McWade as Larkin
 J. Farrell MacDonald as Shuster
 Henry Kolker as Mr. Sanborn
 George Blackwood as Henry
 Walter Walker as Oliver
 Henry O'Neill as Mr. Farrell
 E. J. Ratcliffe as Theodore Roosevelt
 William V. Mong as Bowen
 Douglass Dumbrille as Brandt (uncredited)
 Howard Hickman as Businessman (uncredited)
 Edwin Maxwell as Gossiper (uncredited)

References

External links 
 
 
 
 

1933 films
Films directed by Alfred E. Green
First National Pictures films
Warner Bros. films
1933 drama films
American black-and-white films
American drama films
1930s American films
Films scored by Bernhard Kaun
Films set in Chicago
Films about singers